Deal Island, the largest island of the Kent Group, is a  granite island, located in northern Bass Strait, that lies between the Furneaux Group, north-east of Tasmania, and Wilsons Promontory, in Victoria, Australia.

Location and features
The island is contained entirely within the  Kent Group National Park, Tasmania’s northernmost national park, gazetted in 2002. In 2004, the national park was extended to include the marine waters of the three major islands of the Kent Group, encapsulating  of marine reserve.

Deal Island is at the southern end of the  Beagle Commonwealth Marine Reserve, that encloses the Kent Group Marine Reserve and the Hogan and Curtis Island groups.

Deal Island has been extensively modified by human activity, with the construction of facilities, and the clearing of vegetation and regular firing associated with grazing livestock. There is a lighthouse, a closed airstrip, roads, jetty, two houses, a dam and a museum.

Lighthouse

The lighthouse was built in 1848 and deactivated in 1992. While active, the height of the tower caused problems with visibility in low cloud conditions. Management and conservation of the structure is under the control of the Tasmania Parks and Wildlife Service.

Aircraft crash
On 26 April 1943, during World War II, an RAAF Airspeed Oxford aircraft crashed on the island, killing all four crewmen. Eyewitness accounts say the plane flew low over a ship which was actually a wreck, and then failed to regain enough height before hitting the cliff.

Fauna
Seabird and wader species that have been recorded breeding on the island include the little penguin, the Pacific gull and the sooty oystercatcher. Mammals found on the island include the red-necked wallaby, the common brushtail possum, the southern brown bandicoot, the fur seal, and the introduced European rabbit. Reptiles include the metallic skink, Bougainville's skink, White's skink and the white-lipped snake.

Climate
Deal Island has a borderline Mediterranean (Csb)/oceanic climate (Cfb) with mild, short, somewhat dry summers and cool, wet winters, owing to its exposed location.

See also

 List of islands of Tasmania

References

Protected areas of Tasmania
North East Tasmania
Islands of Bass Strait